E.N.I. is a Croatian pop band from Rijeka. The members are  Ivona Maričić (b. 20 March 1980), Iva Močibob (b. 25 July 1979), Elena Tomeček (b. 17 May 1978) and Nikolina Tomljanović.

Like the Rijeka group Put four years earlier, E.N.I. was created out of Putokazi in order to compete at the Eurovision Song Contest 1997 with the song "Probudi me". They came 17th out of 24 contestants, with 24 points.

In the campaign for 2000 parliamentary elections they, together with many other rock musicians, supported Social Democratic Party of Croatia and other opposition parties. They also appeared at the 2004 Zagreb Pride parade and festival.

Discography

Studio albums
 Probudi Me (1997, HRT Orfej)
 Saten (1998, Orfej)
 Da Capo (2003, Dallas Records)
 Oči Su Ti Ocean (2007, Dallas Records)
 Crna Kutija (2011, Dallas Records)
 Ouija featuring Vava (2012, Dallas Records)

Compilation albums
 Best of E.N.I. (2008, Dallas Records)

References

External links 
 Official web site

Eurovision Song Contest entrants for Croatia
Eurovision Song Contest entrants of 1997
Croatian pop music groups
Musical groups established in 1997
Musicians from Rijeka
Culture in Rijeka
1997 establishments in Croatia
Croatian women singers
Girl groups